Malabar Gopalan Radhakrishnan (29 July 1940 – 2 July 2010) was an Indian music director and Carnatic vocalist from Kerala.

Personal life 

M. G. Radhakrishnan was born on 29 July 1940 at Haripad, in Alappuzha district, Kerala as the eldest of three children of music composer and harmonist Malabar Gopalan Nair and Harikatha exponent Kamalakshi Amma. He studied at the S. D. College, Alappuzha, and undertook Ganabhooshanam from Swathi Thirunal College of Music. K. J. Yesudas was one of his classmates there. His younger brother M. G. Sreekumar is a playback singer in Malayalam and Tamil cinema and his younger sister K. Omanakutty is a carnatic vocalist and academic.

He died on 2 July 2010 at KIMS hospital in Thiruvananthapuram due to liver disease, less than a month short of his 70th birthday.

Career 
M. G. Radhakrishnan was a disciple of Sree Vidyadhiraja Hridayanjali, an Indian ascetic, and composed music for the ascetic's lyrics, which was sung by his younger sister Dr. K Omanakutty, a Carnatic vocalist. In his official capacity, Radhakrishnan worked as a staff and become the senior music composer (Grade 1) in Akashvani, Trivandrum. In 1962, he joined All India Radio as music composer. He used to conduct a 15-minute light music class through AIR.

He made his debut in cinema as a playback singer through "Unniganapathiye..." from Kallichellamma (1969), which had music composed by K. Raghavan. His songs as a vocalist include "Sharike Sharike" from Sharashayya, "Pallanayattin Theerathu" from Ningalenne Communist Aakki etc. He performed at N S S Headquarters at Changanassery and at Karrikkakom Chamundeswary Temple at Thiruvananthapuram. He then focussed at composing light music. 

His debut film as a music director was G. Aravindan's Thampu (1978). He then did Thakara (1980). Songs from this film, Mouname Mouname and Kudayolam Bhoomi won him several accolades and fame. The other major works by him include Adwaitham, Devasuram, Manichithrathazhu, Rakkuyilin Rajasadassil and Ananthabhadram, which was his last work.

He has also composed the poems of Kamala Surayya, an Indian writer, through the album Surayya Padunnu.Radhakrishnan introduced K. S. Chithra, a singer and a student of Omanakutty, to the film and music industry by employing her in the film Attahaasam.

Death 
Radhakrishnan died from liver cirrhosis on 2 July 2010 at KIMS hospital in Thiruvananthapuram. He was admitted there a week ago after his condition worsened, and was in ventilator since then. He was less than a month short of his 70th birthday when he died. He was cremated with full state honours at Thaikkad Santhikavadam electronic crematorium on the next day. His son M. R. Rajakrishnan is a sound recordist). His wife Padmaja, who outlived him for nearly ten years, died on 15 June 2020 following a heart attack.

Awards

Kerala State Film Awards

 2005 – Best Music Director – Ananthabadram
 2001 – Best Music Director – Achaneyaanenikkishtam

Asianet Film Awards
 2005 –  Best Music Director Award – Anandabhadram
 2001 – Best Music Director Award – Kaate Vannu Vilichappol

Others
 2004 – Kerala Sangeetha Nataka Akademi Fellowship
 1995 – Kerala Sangeetha Nataka Akademi Award

Filmography

References

External links

 Official website of M. G. Radhakrishnan foundation
M.G Radhakrishnan passes away
 MG Radhakrishnan at MSI
 Remembering M. G. Radhakrishnan - K. S. Chithra (in Malayalam)
 Remembering M. G. Radhakrishnan - Sreekumaran Thampi (in Malayalam)
 Remembering M. G. Radhakrishnan - Fazil (in Malayalam)
 Remembering M. G. Radhakrishnan - Johnson (in Malayalam)

1940 births
2010 deaths
Deaths from cirrhosis
Indian Hindus
Kerala State Film Award winners
Malayalam film score composers
20th-century Indian composers
People from Alappuzha district
Indian male composers
Film musicians from Kerala
21st-century Indian composers
21st-century Indian male classical singers
20th-century Indian male classical singers
Male Carnatic singers
Carnatic singers
Singers from Kerala
Male film score composers
Recipients of the Kerala Sangeetha Nataka Akademi Fellowship
Recipients of the Kerala Sangeetha Nataka Akademi Award